Qian Hong is the name of:

Qian Hong (Jin dynasty) (died 271), Chinese military general of the Jin dynasty
Qian Hong (swimmer) (born 1971), female Chinese swimmer
Qian Hong (windsurfer) (born 1971),  Chinese windsurfer
Qian Hong (badminton) (born 1976), Chinese badminton player